The 2020 Albanian Supercup was the 27th edition of the Albanian Supercup, an annual Albanian football match.

The match was contested by Tirana, champions of the 2019–20 Kategoria Superiore, and Teuta, the 2019–20 Albanian Cup winners.

Details

See also
2019–20 Kategoria Superiore
2019–20 Albanian Cup

Notes

References

2020
Supercup
Albanian Supercup, 2020
Albanian Supercup, 2020
August 2020 sports events in Europe